Josimar Do Sameiro Spencer Silva Lima (born 2 August 1989) is a Cape Verdean professional footballer who played as a centre-back. He formerly played for Willem II, FC Dordrecht, Al-Shaab, and VVV-Venlo. He currently plays for CION.

References

External links
 
 

Living people
1989 births
People from São Vicente, Cape Verde
Association football defenders
Cape Verdean footballers
Cape Verde international footballers
Cape Verdean expatriate footballers
Eredivisie players
Eerste Divisie players
Tweede Divisie players
Veikkausliiga players
Willem II (football club) players
FC Dordrecht players
Al-Shaab CSC players
FC Emmen players
FC Lahti players
VVV-Venlo players
ASWH players
2013 Africa Cup of Nations players
UAE Pro League players
Cape Verdean expatriate sportspeople in Finland
Cape Verdean expatriate sportspeople in the Netherlands
Cape Verdean expatriate sportspeople in the United Arab Emirates
Expatriate footballers in Finland
Expatriate footballers in the Netherlands
Expatriate footballers in the United Arab Emirates